Grose Wold is a suburb of Sydney, in the state of New South Wales, Australia. It is in the City of Hawkesbury.

RedBank North Richmond has proposed building a bridge through Grose Wold to Yarramundi to get to Penrith quicker and ease traffic and congestion on the North Richmond bridge to Richmond.

References

Suburbs of Sydney
City of Hawkesbury